Pedro J Perez Mestre, born January 19, 1995, is a musician, vocalist, producer and programmer. PJ or better known as "Plush Mush" start making music at the age of 10. He came out of a strict military family and his dreams were put on hold. After he finished his studies, he went to the Army at the age of 19, when he left it, he took that opportunity to dedicate all his time to music. He learned to play guitar in Iraq, from there his love for music increased, when he arrived in his native country (Puerto Rico) he learned how to edit music, two years in a row.

In 2020 he decided to express his emotions and music through all platforms with his first album 'One Mind".

In January 2021 he will be featured on a song by Cirex called 'Opera'.

References

External links 

 

Puerto Rican musicians
Electronic musicians